The 2020 United States House of Representatives elections were held on November 3, 2020, to elect representatives from all 435 congressional districts across each of the 50 U.S. states to the 117th United States Congress, as well as six non-voting delegates from the District of Columbia and the inhabited U.S. territories. Special House elections were also held on various dates throughout 2020.

In the 2018 United States House of Representatives elections, the Democrats had won 235 seats. Leading up to the 2020 elections, the Democrats were projected by many polls to expand their majority by up to 15 seats due to the unpopularity of then-President Donald Trump. While Democrats ultimately retained control of the House following the 2020 elections, Republicans made a net gain of 14 seats and the Democrats entered 2021 with a narrow 222–213 House majority. This was the first time since 2004 that the Republican Party made net gains in the House during a presidential election year.

Republicans exceeded expectations in the 2020 House elections, winning back a number of seats that they lost in 2018 while successfully defending competitive seats that Democrats had hoped to flip. No Republican incumbent was defeated for re-election, while 13 incumbent Democrats were ousted by Republicans; also, several successful Democratic candidates won by smaller-than-expected margins. Many have cited Trump's presence on the ballot as having fueled high Republican turnout, while others have emphasized the Republican Party's efforts to promote their female and minority candidates.

This constitutes the 11th election since the Civil War in which the victorious presidential party lost seats in the House, after the elections of 1868, 1884, 1892, 1896, 1908, 1960, 1988, 1992, 2000, and 2016.

Results summary

Federal 
The 2020 election results are compared below to the November 2018 election, in which only 434 seats were filled (the election results in one constituency were voided). The results summary below does not include blank and over/under votes which were included in the official results.

Per states

Maps

Retirements 
36 incumbents did not seek re-election either to retire or to seek other positions.

Democrats 
Nine Democrats did not seek re-election.
: Susan Davis retired.
: Tulsi Gabbard retired to run for U.S. president.
: Pete Visclosky retired.
: Dave Loebsack retired.
: Joe Kennedy III retired to run for U.S. senator. 
: Ben Ray Luján retired to run for U.S. senator.
: José Serrano retired.
: Nita Lowey retired.
: Denny Heck retired to run for lieutenant governor of Washington.

Libertarians 
One Libertarian did not seek re-election.
: Justin Amash retired.

Republicans 
26 Republicans did not seek re-election.

: Bradley Byrne retired to run for U.S. senator.
: Martha Roby retired.
: Paul Cook retired to run for San Bernardino County supervisor.
: Ted Yoho retired.
: Francis Rooney retired.
: Rob Woodall retired.
: Doug Collins retired to run for U.S. senator.
: John Shimkus retired.
: Susan Brooks retired.
: Roger Marshall retired to run for U.S. senator.
: Ralph Abraham retired.
: Paul Mitchell retired.
: Greg Gianforte retired to  run for governor of Montana.
: Peter T. King retired.
: George Holding retired due to court ordered redistricting.
: Mark Walker retired due to court ordered redistricting.
: Greg Walden retired.
: Phil Roe retired.
: Mike Conaway retired.
: Mac Thornberry retired.
: Bill Flores retired.
: Pete Olson retired.
: Will Hurd retired.
: Kenny Marchant retired.
: Rob Bishop retired to run for lieutenant governor of Utah.
: Jim Sensenbrenner retired.

Resignations 
Four incumbents resigned in 2020, all of them Republicans, with no special elections to fill the vacant seats before the November election.

Republicans 
 : Duncan Hunter resigned January 13 after pleading guilty to one count of misusing campaign funds. Seat won by Republican Darrell Issa.
 : Tom Graves resigned October 4; he had initially planned to retire at the end of the term. Seat won by Republican Marjorie Taylor Greene.
 : Mark Meadows resigned March 30 to become White House Chief of Staff. Seat won by Republican Madison Cawthorn.
 : John Ratcliffe resigned May 22 to become Director of National Intelligence. Seat won by Republican Pat Fallon.

Incumbents defeated

In primary elections 
Eight incumbents lost renomination in 2020, the most in a non-redistricting year since 1974.

Democrats 
Three Democrats lost renomination.
 : Dan Lipinski lost renomination to Marie Newman, who went on to win the general election.
 : Lacy Clay lost renomination to Cori Bush, who went on to win the general election.
 : Eliot Engel lost renomination to Jamaal Bowman, who went on to win the general election.

Republicans 
Five Republicans lost renomination.
 : Scott Tipton lost renomination to Lauren Boebert, who went on to win the general election.
 : Ross Spano lost renomination to Scott Franklin, who went on to win the general election.
 : Steve King lost renomination to Randy Feenstra, who went on to win the general election.
 : Steve Watkins lost renomination to Jake LaTurner, who went on to win the general election.
 : Denver Riggleman lost renomination in a district convention to Bob Good, who went on to win the general election.

In general elections

Democrats 
Thirteen Democrats, twelve of whom were freshmen, lost re-election to Republicans.
 : TJ Cox (first elected in 2018) lost to David Valadao.
 : Gil Cisneros (first elected in 2018) lost to Young Kim.
 : Harley Rouda (first elected in 2018) lost to Michelle Steel.
 : Debbie Mucarsel-Powell (first elected in 2018) lost to Carlos Giménez.
 : Donna Shalala (first elected in 2018) lost to Maria Elvira Salazar.
 : Abby Finkenauer (first elected in 2018) lost to Ashley Hinson.
 : Collin Peterson (first elected in 1990) lost to Michelle Fischbach.
 : Xochitl Torres Small (first elected in 2018) lost to Yvette Herrell.
 : Max Rose (first elected in 2018) lost to Nicole Malliotakis.
 : Anthony Brindisi (first elected in 2018) lost to Claudia Tenney.
 : Kendra Horn (first elected in 2018) lost to Stephanie Bice.
 : Joe Cunningham (first elected in 2018) lost to Nancy Mace.
 : Ben McAdams (first elected in 2018) lost to Burgess Owens.

Republicans 
No Republicans lost re-election.

Open seats that changed parties

Democratic seats won by Republicans 
One Democratic seat was won by a Republican.

 : Won by Mariannette Miller-Meeks.

Libertarian seats won by Republicans 
One Libertarian seat was won by a Republican.

: Won by Peter Meijer.

Republican seats won by Democrats 
Three Republican seats were won by Democrats.

: Won by Carolyn Bourdeaux.
: Won by Deborah K. Ross.
: Won by Kathy Manning.

Open seats that parties held

Democratic seats held by Democrats 
Democrats held twelve of their open seats.

: Won by Sara Jacobs
: Won by Nikema Williams
: Won by Kai Kahele
: Won by Marie Newman
: Won by Frank J. Mrvan
: Won by Jake Auchincloss
: Won by Cori Bush
: Won by Teresa Leger Fernandez
: Won by Ritchie Torres
: Won by Jamaal Bowman
: Won by Mondaire Jones
: Won by Marilyn Strickland

Republican seats held by Republicans 
Republicans held thirty-two of their open seats.

: Won by Jerry Carl
: Won by Barry Moore
: Won by Jay Obernolte
: Won by Darrell Issa
: Won by Lauren Boebert
: Won by Kat Cammack
: Won by Scott Franklin
: Won by Byron Donalds
: Won by Andrew Clyde
: Won by Marjorie Taylor Greene
: Won by Mary Miller
: Won by Victoria Spartz
: Won by Randy Feenstra
: Won by Tracey Mann
: Won by Jake LaTurner
: Won by Luke Letlow
: Won by Lisa McClain
: Won by Matt Rosendale
: Won by Andrew Garbarino
: Won by Madison Cawthorn
: Won by Cliff Bentz
: Won by Diana Harshbarger
: Won by Pat Fallon
: Won by August Pfluger
: Won by Ronny Jackson
: Won by Pete Sessions
: Won by Troy Nehls
: Won by Tony Gonzales
: Won by Beth Van Duyne
: Won by Blake Moore
: Won by Bob Good
: Won by Scott L. Fitzgerald

Closest races 
Seventy-seven races were decided by 10% or lower.

Election ratings

Special elections 

There were five special elections in 2020 to the 116th United States Congress, listed here by date and district.

|-
! 
| Elijah Cummings
| 
| 1996
|  | Incumbent died October 17, 2019.New member elected April 28, 2020.Democratic hold.
| nowrap | 

|-
! 
| Katie Hill
| 
| 2018
|  | Incumbent resigned November 3, 2019 amid ethics investigation.New member elected May 12, 2020 in a runoff.Republican gain.
| nowrap | 

|-
! 
| Sean Duffy
| 
| 2010
|  | Incumbent resigned September 23, 2019 for family health reasons.New member elected May 12, 2020.Republican hold.
| nowrap | 

|-
! 
| Chris Collins
| 
| 2012
| | Incumbent resigned October 1, 2019 due to federal insider trading conviction.New member elected June 23, 2020.Republican hold.
| nowrap | 

|-
! 
| John Lewis
| 
| 1986
| | Incumbent died July 17, 2020.New member elected December 1, 2020 after no candidate received a majority vote in the September 29, 2020 blanket primary.Democratic hold.
| nowrap | 

|}

Election dates 
These are the election dates for the regularly scheduled general elections.

Alabama 

|-
! 
| 
| 
| 
| 2013 
|  | Incumbent retired to run for U.S. senator.New member elected.Republican hold.
| nowrap | 

|-
! 
| 
| 
| 
| 2010
|  | Incumbent retired.New member elected.Republican hold.
| nowrap | 

|-
! 
| 
| 
| 
| 2002
| Incumbent re-elected.
| nowrap | 

|-
! 
| 
| 
| 
| 1996
| Incumbent re-elected.
| nowrap | 

|-
! 
| 
| 
| 
| 2010
| Incumbent re-elected.
| nowrap | 

|-
! 
| 
| 
| 
| 2014
| Incumbent re-elected.
| nowrap | 

|-
! 
| 
| 
| 
| 2010
| Incumbent re-elected.
| nowrap | 

|}

Alaska 

|-
! 
| 
| Don Young
| 
| 1973 
| Incumbent re-elected.
| nowrap | 

|}

Arizona 

|-
! 
| 
| 
| 
| 2016
| Incumbent re-elected.
| nowrap | 

|-
! 
| 
| 
| 
| 20082010 20122016 2018
| Incumbent re-elected.
| nowrap | 

|-
! 
| 
| 
| 
| 2002
| Incumbent re-elected.
| nowrap | 

|-
! 
| 
| 
| 
| 2010
| Incumbent re-elected.
| nowrap | 

|-
! 
| 
| 
| 
| 2016
| Incumbent re-elected.
| nowrap | 

|-
! 
| 
| 
| 
| 2010
| Incumbent re-elected.
| nowrap | 

|-
! 
| 
| 
| 
| 2014
| Incumbent re-elected.
| nowrap | 

|-
! 
| 
| 
| 
| 2018 
| Incumbent re-elected.
| nowrap | 

|-
! 
| 
| 
| 
| 2018
| Incumbent re-elected.
| nowrap | 
|}

Arkansas 

|-
! 
| 
| 
| 
| 2010
| Incumbent re-elected.
| nowrap | 

|-
! 
| 
| 
| 
| 2014
| Incumbent re-elected.
| nowrap | 

|-
! 
| 
| 
| 
| 2010
| Incumbent re-elected.
| nowrap | 

|-
! 
| 
| 
| 
| 2014
| Incumbent re-elected.
| nowrap | 

|}

California 

|-
! 
| 
| 
| 
| 2012
| Incumbent re-elected.
| nowrap | 

|-
! 
| 
| 
| 
| 2012
| Incumbent re-elected.
| nowrap | 

|-
! 
| 
| 
| 
| 2009 
| Incumbent re-elected.
| nowrap | 

|-
! 
| 
| 
| 
| 2008
| Incumbent re-elected.
| nowrap | 

|-
! 
| 
| 
| 
| 1998
| Incumbent re-elected.
| nowrap | 

|-
! 
| 
| 
| 
| 2005 
| Incumbent re-elected.
| nowrap | 

|-
! 
| 
| 
| 
| 2012
| Incumbent re-elected.
| nowrap | 

|-
! 
| 
| 
| 
| 2012
|  | Incumbent retired to run for San Bernardino County supervisor.New member elected.Republican hold.
| nowrap | 

|-
! 
| 
| 
| 
| 2006
| Incumbent re-elected.
| nowrap | 

|-
! 
|
| 
| 
| 2018
| Incumbent re-elected.
| nowrap | 

|-
! 
| 
| 
| 
| 2014
| Incumbent re-elected.
| nowrap | 

|-
! 
| 
| 
| 
| 1987 
| Incumbent re-elected.
| nowrap | 

|-
! 
| 
| 
| 
| 1998 
| Incumbent re-elected.
| nowrap | 

|-
! 
| 
| 
| 
| 2008 
| Incumbent re-elected.
| nowrap | 

|-
! 
| 
| 
| 
| 2012
| Incumbent re-elected.
| nowrap | 

|-
! 
| 
| 
| 
| 2004
| Incumbent re-elected.
| nowrap | 

|-
! 
| 
| 
| 
| 2016
| Incumbent re-elected.
| nowrap | 

|-
! 
| 
| 
| 
| 1992
| Incumbent re-elected.
| nowrap | 

|-
! 
| 
| 
| 
| 1994
| Incumbent re-elected.
| nowrap | 

|-
! 
| 
| 
| 
| 2016
| Incumbent re-elected.
| nowrap | 

|-
! 
| 
| 
| 
| 2018
|  | Incumbent lost re-election.New member elected.Republican gain.
| nowrap | 

|-
! 
| 
| 
| 
| 2002
| Incumbent re-elected.
| nowrap | 

|-
! 
| 
| 
| 
| 2006
| Incumbent re-elected.
| nowrap | 

|-
! 
| 
| 
| 
| 2016
| Incumbent re-elected.
| nowrap | 

|-
! 
|
| 
| 
| 2020 
| Incumbent re-elected.
| nowrap | 

|-
! 
| 
| 
| 
| 2012
| Incumbent re-elected.
| nowrap | 

|-
! 
| 
| 
| 
| 2009 
| Incumbent re-elected.
| nowrap | 

|-
! 
| 
| 
| 
| 2000
| Incumbent re-elected.
| nowrap | 

|-
! 
| 
| 
| 
| 2012
| Incumbent re-elected.
| nowrap | 

|-
! 
| 
| 
| 
| 1996
| Incumbent re-elected.
| nowrap | 

|-
! 
| 
| 
| 
| 2014
| Incumbent re-elected.
| nowrap | 

|-
! 
| 
| 
| 
| 1998
| Incumbent re-elected.
| nowrap | 

|-
! 
| 
| 
| 
| 2014
| Incumbent re-elected.
| nowrap | 

|-
! 
| 
| 
| 
| 2017 
| Incumbent re-elected
| nowrap | 

|-
! 
| 
| 
| 
| 2014
| Incumbent re-elected.
| nowrap | 

|-
! 
| 
| 
| 
| 2012
| Incumbent re-elected.
| nowrap | 

|-
! 
| 
| 
| 
| 2010
| Incumbent re-elected.
| nowrap | 

|-
! 
| 
| 
| 
| 2002
| Incumbent re-elected.
| nowrap | 

|-
! 
|
| 
| 
| 2018
|  | Incumbent lost re-election.New member elected.Republican gain.
| nowrap | 

|-
! 
| 
| 
| 
| 1992
| Incumbent re-elected.
| nowrap | 

|-
! 
| 
| 
| 
| 2012
| Incumbent re-elected.
| nowrap | 

|-
! 
| 
| 
| 
| 1992
| Incumbent re-elected.
| nowrap | 

|-
! 
| 
| 
| 
| 1990
| Incumbent re-elected.
| nowrap | 

|-
! 
| 
| 
| 
| 2016
| Incumbent re-elected.
| nowrap | 

|-
! 
| 
| 
| 
| 2018
| Incumbent re-elected.
| nowrap | 

|-
! 
| 
| 
| 
| 2016
| Incumbent re-elected.
| nowrap | 

|-
! 
| 
| 
| 
| 2012
| Incumbent re-elected.
| nowrap | 

|-
! 
| 
| 
| 
| 2018
|  | Incumbent lost re-election.New member elected.Republican gain.
| nowrap | 

|-
! 
| 
| 
| 
| 2018
| Incumbent re-elected.
| nowrap | 

|-
! 
| 
| colspan=3 | Vacant
|  | Rep. Duncan D. Hunter (R) resigned January 13, 2020.New member elected.Republican hold.
| nowrap | 

|-
! 
| 
| 
| 
| 2012
| Incumbent re-elected.
| nowrap | 

|-
! 
| 
| 
| 
| 2012
| Incumbent re-elected.
| nowrap | 

|-
! 
| 
| 
| 
| 2000
|  | Incumbent retired.New member elected.Democratic hold.
| nowrap | 

|}

Colorado 

|-
! 
| 
| 
| 
| 1996
| Incumbent re-elected.
| nowrap | 

|-
! 
| 
| 
| 
| 2018
| Incumbent re-elected.
| nowrap | 

|-
! 
| 
| 
| 
| 2010
| | Incumbent lost renomination.New member elected.Republican hold.
| nowrap | 

|-
! 
| 
| 
| 
| 2014
| Incumbent re-elected.
| nowrap | 

|-
! 
| 
| 
| 
| 2006
| Incumbent re-elected.
| nowrap | 

|-
! 
| 
| 
| 
| 2018
| Incumbent re-elected.
| nowrap | 

|-
! 
| 
| 
| 
| 2006
| Incumbent re-elected.
| nowrap | 

|}

Connecticut 

|-
! 
| 
| 
| 
| 1998
| Incumbent re-elected.
| nowrap | 

|-
! 
| 
| 
| 
| 2006
| Incumbent re-elected.
| nowrap | 

|-
! 
| 
| 
| 
| 1990
| Incumbent re-elected.
| nowrap | 

|-
! 
| 
| 
| 
| 2008
| Incumbent re-elected.
| nowrap | 

|-
! 
| 
| 
| 
| 2018
| Incumbent re-elected.
| nowrap | 

|}

Delaware 

|-
! 
| 
| Lisa Blunt Rochester
| 
| 2016
| Incumbent re-elected.
| nowrap | 

|}

Florida 

|-
! 
| 
| 
| 
| 2016
| Incumbent re-elected.
| nowrap | 

|-
! 
| 
| 
| 
| 2016
| Incumbent re-elected.
| nowrap | 

|-
! 
| 
| 
| 
| 2012
|  | Incumbent retired.New member elected.Republican hold.
| nowrap | 

|-
! 
| 
| 
| 
| 2016
| Incumbent re-elected.
| nowrap | 

|-
! 
| 
| 
| 
| 2016
| Incumbent re-elected.
| nowrap | 

|-
! 
| 
| 
| 
| 2018
| Incumbent re-elected.
| nowrap | 

|-
! 
|
| 
| 
| 2016
| Incumbent re-elected.
| nowrap | 

|-
! 
| 
| 
| 
| 2008
| Incumbent re-elected.
| nowrap | 

|-
! 
| 
| 
| 
| 2016
| Incumbent re-elected.
| nowrap | 

|-
! 
| 
| 
| 
| 2016
| Incumbent re-elected.
| nowrap | 

|-
! 
| 
| 
| 
| 2010
| Incumbent re-elected.
| nowrap | 

|-
! 
| 
| 
| 
| 2006
| Incumbent re-elected.
| nowrap | 

|-
! 
| 
| 
| 
| 2016
| Incumbent re-elected.
| nowrap | 

|-
! 
| 
| 
| 
| 2006
| Incumbent re-elected.
| nowrap | 

|-
! 
| 
| 
| 
| 2018
|  | Incumbent lost renomination.New member elected.Republican hold.
| nowrap | 

|-
! 
| 
| 
| 
| 2006
| Incumbent re-elected.
| nowrap | 

|-
! 
| 
| 
| 
| 2018
| Incumbent re-elected.
| nowrap | 

|-
! 
| 
| 
| 
| 2016
| Incumbent re-elected.
| nowrap | 

|-
! 
| 
| 
| 
| 2016
|  | Incumbent retired.New member elected.Republican hold.
| nowrap | 

|-
! 
| 
| 
| 
| 1992
| Incumbent re-elected.
| nowrap | 

|-
! 
| 
| 
| 
| 2012
| Incumbent re-elected.
| nowrap | 

|-
! 
| 
| 
| 
| 2010 
| Incumbent re-elected.
| nowrap | 

|-
! 
| 
| 
| 
| 2004
| Incumbent re-elected.
| nowrap | 

|-
! 
| 
| 
| 
| 2010
| Incumbent re-elected.
| nowrap | 

|-
! 
| 
| 
| 
| 2002
| Incumbent re-elected.
| nowrap | 

|-
! 
| 
| 
| 
| 2018
|  | Incumbent lost re-election.New member elected.Republican gain.
| nowrap | 

|-
! 
| 
| 
| 
| 2018
|  | Incumbent lost re-election.New member elected.Republican gain.
| nowrap | 

|}

Georgia 

|-
! 
| 
| 
| 
| 2014
| Incumbent re-elected.
| nowrap | 

|-
! 
| 
| 
| 
| 1992
| Incumbent re-elected.
| nowrap | 

|-
! 
| 
| 
| 
| 2016
| Incumbent re-elected.
| nowrap | 

|-
! 
| 
| 
| 
| 2006
| Incumbent re-elected.
| nowrap | 

|-
! 
| 
| colspan=3 | Vacant
| | Rep. John Lewis (D) died July 17, 2020.New member elected.Democratic hold.A different Democrat, Kwanza Hall was elected on December 1 to finish the current term.
| nowrap | 

|-
! 
| 
| 
| 
| 2018
| Incumbent re-elected.
| nowrap | 

|-
! 
| 
| 
| 
| 2010
|  | Incumbent retired.New member elected.Democratic gain.
| nowrap | 

|-
! 
| 
| 
| 
| 2010
| Incumbent re-elected.
| nowrap | 

|-
! 
| 
| 
| 
| 2012
|  | Incumbent retired to run for U.S. senator.New member elected.Republican hold.
| nowrap | 

|-
! 
| 
| 
| 
| 2014
| Incumbent re-elected.
| nowrap | 

|-
! 
| 
| 
| 
| 2014
| Incumbent re-elected.
| nowrap | 

|-
! 
| 
| 
| 
| 2014
| Incumbent re-elected.
| nowrap | 

|-
! 
| 
| 
| 
| 2002
| Incumbent re-elected.
| nowrap | 

|-
! 
| 
| colspan=3 | Vacant
|  | Rep. Tom Graves (R) resigned October 4, 2020.New member elected.Republican hold.
| nowrap | 

|}

Hawaii 

|-
! 
| 
| data-sort-value="Case Ed" | Ed Case
| 
| 2002 2006 2018
| Incumbent re-elected.
| nowrap | 

|-
! 
| 
| data-sort-value="Gabbard Tulsi" | Tulsi Gabbard
| 
| 2012
|  | Incumbent retired to run for U.S. president.New member elected.Democratic hold.
| nowrap | 

|}

Idaho 

|-
! 
| 
| 
| 
| 2018
| Incumbent re-elected.
| nowrap | 

|-
! 
| 
| 
| 
| 1998
| Incumbent re-elected.
| nowrap | 

|}

Illinois 

|-
! 
| 
| 
| 
| 1992
| Incumbent re-elected.
| nowrap | 

|-
! 
| 
| 
| 
| 2013 
| Incumbent re-elected.
| nowrap | 

|-
! 
| 
| 
| 
| 2004
|  | Incumbent lost renomination.New member elected.Democratic hold.
| nowrap | 

|-
! 
| 
| 
| 
| 2018
| Incumbent re-elected.
| nowrap | 

|-
! 
| 
| 
| 
| 2009 
| Incumbent re-elected.
| nowrap | 

|-
! 
| 
| 
| 
| 2018
| Incumbent re-elected.
| nowrap | 

|-
! 
| 
| 
| 
| 1996
| Incumbent re-elected.
| nowrap | 

|-
! 
| 
| 
| 
| 2016
| Incumbent re-elected.
| nowrap | 

|-
! 
| 
| 
| 
| 1998
| Incumbent re-elected.
| nowrap | 

|-
! 
| 
| 
| 
| 20122014 2016
| Incumbent re-elected.
| nowrap | 

|-
! 
| 
| 
| 
| 2008 2010 2012
| Incumbent re-elected.
| nowrap | 

|-
! 
| 
| 
| 
| 2014
| Incumbent re-elected.
| nowrap | 

|-
! 
| 
| 
| 
| 2012
| Incumbent re-elected.
| nowrap | 

|-
! 
| 
| 
| 
| 2018
| Incumbent re-elected.
| nowrap | 

|-
! 
| 
| 
| 
| 1996
|  | Incumbent retired.New member elected.Republican hold.
| nowrap | 

|-
! 
| 
| 
| 
| 2010
| Incumbent re-elected.
| nowrap | 

|-
! 
| 
| 
| 
| 2012
| Incumbent re-elected.
| nowrap | 

|-
! 
| 
| 
| 
| 2015 
| Incumbent re-elected
| nowrap | 

|}

Indiana 

|-
! 
| 
| 
| 
| 1984
|  | Incumbent retired.New member elected.Democratic hold.
| nowrap | 

|-
! 
| 
| 
| 
| 2012
| Incumbent re-elected.
| nowrap | 

|-
! 
| 
| 
| 
| 2016
| Incumbent re-elected.
| nowrap | 

|-
! 
| 
| 
| 
| 2018
| Incumbent re-elected.
| nowrap | 

|-
! 
| 
| 
| 
| 2012
|  | Incumbent retired.New member elected.Republican hold.
| nowrap | 

|-
! 
| 
| 
| 
| 2018
| Incumbent re-elected.
| nowrap | 

|-
! 
| 
| 
| 
| 2008 
| Incumbent re-elected.
| nowrap | 

|-
! 
| 
| 
| 
| 2010
| Incumbent re-elected.
| nowrap | 

|-
! 
| 
| 
| 
| 2016
| Incumbent re-elected.
| nowrap | 

|}

Iowa 

|-
! 
| 
| 
| 
| 2018
|  | Incumbent lost re-election.New member elected.Republican gain.
| nowrap | 

|-
! 
| 
| Dave Loebsack
| 
| 2006
|  | Incumbent retired.New member elected.Republican gain.
| nowrap | 

|-
! 
| 
| 
| 
| 2018
| Incumbent re-elected.
| nowrap | 

|-
! 
| 
| 
| 
| 2002
|  | Incumbent lost renomination.New member elected.Republican hold.
| nowrap | 

|}

Kansas 

|-
! 
| 
| 
| 
| 2016
|  | Incumbent retired to run for U.S. senator.New member elected.Republican hold.
| nowrap | 

|-
! 
| 
| 
| 
| 2018
|  | Incumbent lost renomination.New member elected.Republican hold.
| nowrap | 

|-
! 
| 
| 
| 
| 2018
| Incumbent re-elected.
| nowrap | 

|-
! 
| 
| 
| 
| 2017 
| Incumbent re-elected.
| nowrap | 

|}

Kentucky 

|-
! 
| 
| 
| 
| 2016
| Incumbent re-elected.
| nowrap | 

|-
! 
| 
| 
| 
| 2008
| Incumbent re-elected.
| nowrap | 

|-
! 
| 
| 
| 
| 2006
| Incumbent re-elected.
| nowrap | 

|-
! 
| 
| 
| 
| 2012
| Incumbent re-elected.
| nowrap | 

|-
! 
| 
| 
| 
| 1980
| Incumbent re-elected.
| nowrap | 

|-
! 
| 
| 
| 
| 2012
| Incumbent re-elected.
| nowrap | 

|}

Louisiana 

|-
! 
| 
| 
| 
| 2008 
| Incumbent re-elected.
| nowrap | 

|-
! 
| 
| 
| 
| 2010
| Incumbent re-elected.
| nowrap | 

|-
! 
| 
| 
| 
| 2016
| Incumbent re-elected.
| nowrap | 

|-
! 
| 
| 
| 
| 2016
| Incumbent re-elected.
| nowrap | 

|-
! 
| 
| 
| 
| 2014
|  | Incumbent retired.New member elected.Republican hold.
| nowrap data-sort-value="ZZZ" | 

|-
! 
| 
| 
| 
| 2014
| Incumbent re-elected.
| nowrap | 

|}

Maine 

|-
! 
| 
| 
| 
| 2008
| Incumbent re-elected.
| nowrap | 

|-
! 
| 
| 
| 
| 2018
| Incumbent re-elected.
| nowrap | 

|}

Maryland 

|-
! 
| 
| 
| 
| 2010
| Incumbent re-elected.
| nowrap | 

|-
! 
| 
| 
| 
| 2002
| Incumbent re-elected.
| nowrap | 

|-
! 
| 
| 
| 
| 2006
| Incumbent re-elected.
| nowrap | 

|-
! 
| 
| 
| 
| 2016
| Incumbent re-elected.
| nowrap | 

|-
! 
| 
| 
| 
| 1981 
| Incumbent re-elected.
| nowrap | 

|-
! 
| 
| 
| 
| 2018
| Incumbent re-elected.
| nowrap | 

|-
! 
| 
| 
| 
| 19861996 2020 
| Incumbent re-elected.
| nowrap | 

|-
! 
| 
| 
| 
| 2016
| Incumbent re-elected.
| nowrap | 

|}

Massachusetts 

|-
! 
| 
| 
| 
| 1988
| Incumbent re-elected.
| nowrap | 

|-
! 
| 
| 
| 
| 1996
| Incumbent re-elected.
| nowrap | 

|-
! 
| 
| 
| 
| 2018
| Incumbent re-elected.
| nowrap | 

|-
! 
| 
| 
| 
| 2012
|  | Incumbent retired to run for U.S. senator.New member elected.Democratic hold.
| nowrap | 

|-
! 
| 
| 
| 
| 2013 
| Incumbent re-elected.
| nowrap | 

|-
! 
| 
| 
| 
| 2014
| Incumbent re-elected.
| nowrap | 

|-
! 
| 
| 
| 
| 2018
| Incumbent re-elected.
| nowrap | 

|-
! 
| 
| 
| 
| 2001 
| Incumbent re-elected.
| nowrap | 

|-
! 
| 
| 
| 
| 2010
| Incumbent re-elected.
| nowrap | 

|}

Michigan 

|-
! 
| 
| 
| 
| 2016
| Incumbent re-elected.
| nowrap | 

|-
! 
| 
| 
| 
| 2010
| Incumbent re-elected.
| nowrap | 

|-
! 
| 
| 
|  | Libertarian
| 2010
|  | Incumbent retired.New member elected.Republican gain.
| nowrap | 

|-
! 
| 
| 
| 
| 2014
| Incumbent re-elected.
| nowrap | 

|-
! 
| 
| 
| 
| 2012
| Incumbent re-elected.
| nowrap | 

|-
! 
| 
| 
| 
| 1986
| Incumbent re-elected.
| nowrap | 

|-
! 
| 
| 
| 
| 20062008 2010
| Incumbent re-elected.
| nowrap | 

|-
! 
| 
| 
| 
| 2018
| Incumbent re-elected.
| nowrap | 

|-
! 
| 
| 
| 
| 2018
| Incumbent re-elected.
| nowrap | 

|-
! 
| 
| 
| 
| 2016
|  | Incumbent retired.New member elected.Republican hold.
| nowrap | 

|-
! 
| 
| 
| 
| 2018
| Incumbent re-elected.
| nowrap | 

|-
! 
| 
| 
| 
| 2014
| Incumbent re-elected.
| nowrap | 

|-
! 
| 
| 
| 
| 2018
| Incumbent re-elected.
| nowrap | 

|-
! 
| 
| 
| 
| 2014
| Incumbent re-elected.
| nowrap | 

|}

Minnesota 

|-
! 
| 
| 
| 
| 2018
| Incumbent re-elected.
| nowrap | 

|-
! 
| 
| 
| 
| 2018
| Incumbent re-elected.
| nowrap | 

|-
! 
| 
| 
| 
| 2018
| Incumbent re-elected.
| nowrap | 

|-
! 
| 
| 
| 
| 2000
| Incumbent re-elected.
| nowrap | 

|-
! 
| 
| 
| 
| 2018
| Incumbent re-elected.
| nowrap | 

|-
! 
| 
| 
| 
| 2014
| Incumbent re-elected.
| nowrap | 

|-
! 
| 
| 
| 
| 1990
|  | Incumbent lost re-election.New member elected.Republican gain.
| nowrap | 

|-
! 
| 
| 
| 
| 2018
| Incumbent re-elected.
| nowrap | 

|}

Mississippi 

|-
! 
| 
| 
| 
| 2015 
| Incumbent re-elected.
| nowrap | 

|-
! 
| 
| 
| 
| 1993 
| Incumbent re-elected.
| nowrap | 

|-
! 
| 
| 
| 
| 2018
| Incumbent re-elected.
| nowrap | 

|-
! 
| 
| 
| 
| 2010
| Incumbent re-elected.
| nowrap | 

|}

Missouri 

|-
! 
| 
| 
| 
| 2000
|  | Incumbent lost renomination.New member elected.Democratic hold.
| nowrap | 

|-
! 
| 
| 
| 
| 2012
| Incumbent re-elected.
| nowrap | 

|-
! 
| 
| 
| 
| 2008
| Incumbent re-elected.
| nowrap | 

|-
! 
| 
| 
| 
| 2010
| Incumbent re-elected.
| nowrap | 

|-
! 
| 
| 
| 
| 2004
| Incumbent re-elected.
| nowrap | 

|-
! 
| 
| 
| 
| 2000
| Incumbent re-elected.
| nowrap | 

|-
! 
| 
| 
| 
| 2010
| Incumbent re-elected.
| nowrap | 

|-
! 
| 
| 
| 
| 2013 
| Incumbent re-elected.
| nowrap | 

|}

Montana 

|-
! 
| 
| Greg Gianforte
| 
| 2017 
|  | Incumbent retired to run for governor of Montana.New member elected.Republican hold.
| nowrap | 

|}

Nebraska 

|-
! 
| 
| 
| 
| 2004
| Incumbent re-elected.
| nowrap | 

|-
! 
| 
| 
| 
| 2016
| Incumbent re-elected.
| nowrap | 

|-
! 
| 
| 
| 
| 2006
| Incumbent re-elected.
| nowrap | 

|}

Nevada 

|-
! 
| 
| 
| 
| 20082010 2012
| Incumbent re-elected.
| nowrap | 

|-
! 
| 
| 
| 
| 2011 
| Incumbent re-elected.
| nowrap | 

|-
! 
| 
| 
| 
| 2018
| Incumbent re-elected.
| nowrap | 

|-
! 
| 
| 
| 
| 20142016 2018
| Incumbent re-elected.
| nowrap | 

|}

New Hampshire 

|-
! 
| 
| Chris Pappas
| 
| 2018
| Incumbent re-elected.
| nowrap | 

|-
! 
| 
| Ann McLane Kuster
| 
| 2012
| Incumbent re-elected.
| nowrap | 

|}

New Jersey 

|-
! 
| 
| 
| 
| 2014
| Incumbent re-elected.
| nowrap | 

|-
! 
| 
| 
| 
| 2018
| Incumbent re-elected.
| nowrap | 

|-
! 
| 
| 
| 
| 2018
| Incumbent re-elected.
| nowrap | 

|-
! 
| 
| 
| 
| 1980
| Incumbent re-elected.
| nowrap | 

|-
! 
| 
| 
| 
| 2016
| Incumbent re-elected.
| nowrap | 

|-
! 
| 
| 
| 
| 1988
| Incumbent re-elected.
| nowrap | 

|-
! 
| 
| 
| 
| 2018
| Incumbent re-elected.
| nowrap | 

|-
! 
| 
| 
| 
| 2006
| Incumbent re-elected.
| nowrap | 

|-
! 
| 
| 
| 
| 1996
| Incumbent re-elected.
| nowrap | 

|-
! 
| 
| 
| 
| 2012
| Incumbent re-elected.
| nowrap | 

|-
! 
| 
| 
| 
| 2018
| Incumbent re-elected.
| nowrap | 

|-
! 
| 
| 
| 
| 2014
| Incumbent re-elected.
| nowrap | 

|}

New Mexico 

|-
! 
| 
| 
| 
| 2018
| Incumbent re-elected.
| nowrap | 

|-
! 
| 
| 
| 
| 2018
|  | Incumbent lost re-election.New member elected.Republican gain.
| nowrap | 

|-
! 
| 
| 
| 
| 2008
|  | Incumbent retired to run for U.S. senator.New member elected.Democratic hold.
| nowrap | 

|}

New York 

|-
! 
| 
| 
| 
| 2014
| Incumbent re-elected.
| nowrap | 

|-
! 
| 
| 
| 
| 1992
|  | Incumbent retired.New member elected.Republican hold.
| nowrap | 

|-
! 
| 
| 
| 
| 2016
| Incumbent re-elected.
| nowrap | 

|-
! 
| 
| 
| 
| 2014
| Incumbent re-elected.
| nowrap | 

|-
! 
| 
| 
| 
| 1998
| Incumbent re-elected.
| nowrap | 

|-
! 
| 
| 
| 
| 2012
| Incumbent re-elected.
| nowrap | 

|-
! 
| 
| 
| 
| 1992
| Incumbent re-elected.
| nowrap | 

|-
! 
| 
| 
| 
| 2012
| Incumbent re-elected.
| nowrap | 

|-
! 
| 
| 
| 
| 2006
| Incumbent re-elected.
| nowrap | 

|-
! 
| 
| 
| 
| 1992
| Incumbent re-elected.
| nowrap | 

|-
! 
| 
| 
| 
| 2018
|  | Incumbent lost re-election.New member elected.Republican gain.
| nowrap | 

|-
! 
| 
| 
| 
| 1992
| Incumbent re-elected.
| nowrap | 

|-
! 
| 
| 
| 
| 2016
| Incumbent re-elected.
| nowrap | 

|-
! 
| 
| 
| 
| 2018
| Incumbent re-elected.
| nowrap | 

|-
! 
| 
| 
| 
| 1990
|  | Incumbent retired.New member elected.Democratic hold.
| nowrap | 

|-
! 
| 
| 
| 
| 1988
|  | Incumbent lost renomination.New member elected.Democratic hold.
| nowrap | 

|-
! 
| 
| 
| 
| 1988
|  | Incumbent retired.New member elected.Democratic hold.
| nowrap | 

|-
! 
| 
| 
| 
| 2012
| Incumbent re-elected.
| nowrap | 

|-
! 
| 
| 
| 
| 2018
| Incumbent re-elected.
| nowrap | 

|-
! 
| 
| 
| 
| 2008
| Incumbent re-elected.
| nowrap | 

|-
! 
| 
| 
| 
| 2014
| Incumbent re-elected.
| nowrap | 

|-
! 
| 
| Anthony Brindisi
| 
| 2018
|  | Incumbent lost re-election.New member elected.Republican gain.Winner's term delayed to February 11, 2021, due to court ordered recount.
| nowrap | 

|-
! 
| 
| 
| 
| 2010 
| Incumbent re-elected.
| nowrap | 

|-
! 
| 
| 
| 
| 2014
| Incumbent re-elected.
| nowrap | 

|-
! 
| 
| 
| 
| 2018 
| Incumbent re-elected.
| nowrap | 

|-
! 
| 
| 
| 
| 2004
| Incumbent re-elected.
| nowrap | 

|-
! 
| 
| 
| 
| 2020 
| Incumbent re-elected.
| nowrap | 
|}

North Carolina 

|-
! 
| 
| 
| 
| 2004 
| Incumbent re-elected.
| nowrap | 

|-
! 
| 
| 
| 
| 2012
|  | Incumbent retired.New member elected.Democratic gain.
| nowrap | 

|-
! 
| 
| 
| 
| 2019 
| Incumbent re-elected.
| nowrap | 

|-
! 
| 
| 
| 
| 19861994 1996
| Incumbent re-elected.
| nowrap | 

|-
! 
| 
| 
| 
| 2004
| Incumbent re-elected.
| nowrap | 

|-
! 
| 
| 
| 
| 2014
|  | Incumbent retired.New member elected.Democratic gain.
| nowrap | 

|-
! 
| 
| 
| 
| 2014
| Incumbent re-elected.
| nowrap | 

|-
! 
| 
| 
| 
| 2012
| Incumbent re-elected.
| nowrap | 

|-
! 
| 
| 
| 
| 2019 
| Incumbent re-elected.
| nowrap | 

|-
! 
| 
| 
| 
| 2004
| Incumbent re-elected.
| nowrap | 

|-
! 
| 
| colspan=3 | Vacant
|  | Rep. Mark Meadows (R) resigned March 30, 2020.New member elected.Republican hold.
| nowrap | 

|-
! 
| 
| 
| 
| 2014
| Incumbent re-elected.
| nowrap | 

|-
! 
| 
| 
| 
| 2016
| Incumbent re-elected.
| nowrap | 

|}

North Dakota 

|-
! 
| 
| Kelly Armstrong
| 
| 2018
| Incumbent re-elected.
| nowrap| 

|}

Ohio 

|-
! 
| 
| 
| 
| 19942008 2010
| Incumbent re-elected.
| nowrap | 

|-
! 
| 
| 
| 
| 2012
| Incumbent re-elected.
| nowrap | 

|-
! 
| 
| 
| 
| 2012
| Incumbent re-elected.
| nowrap | 

|-
! 
| 
| 
| 
| 2006
| Incumbent re-elected.
| nowrap | 

|-
! 
| 
| 
| 
| 2008
| Incumbent re-elected.
| nowrap | 

|-
! 
| 
| 
| 
| 2010
| Incumbent re-elected.
| nowrap | 

|-
! 
| 
| 
| 
| 2010
| Incumbent re-elected.
| nowrap | 

|-
! 
| 
| 
| 
| 2016 
| Incumbent re-elected.
| nowrap | 

|-
! 
| 
| 
| 
| 1982
| Incumbent re-elected.
| nowrap | 

|-
! 
| 
| 
| 
| 2002
| Incumbent re-elected.
| nowrap | 

|-
! 
| 
| 
| 
| 2008 
| Incumbent re-elected.
| nowrap | 

|-
! 
| 
| 
| 
| 2018 
| Incumbent re-elected.
| nowrap | 

|-
! 
| 
| 
| 
| 2002
| Incumbent re-elected.
| nowrap | 

|-
! 
| 
| 
| 
| 2012
| Incumbent re-elected.
| nowrap | 

|-
! 
| 
| 
| 
| 2010
| Incumbent re-elected.
| nowrap | 

|-
! 
| 
| 
| 
| 2018
| Incumbent re-elected.
| nowrap | 

|}

Oklahoma 

|-
! 
| 
| 
| 
| 2018
| Incumbent re-elected.
| nowrap | 

|-
! 
| 
| 
| 
| 2012
| Incumbent re-elected.
| nowrap | 

|-
! 
| 
| 
| 
| 1994
| Incumbent re-elected.
| nowrap | 

|-
! 
| 
| 
| 
| 2002
| Incumbent re-elected.
| nowrap | 

|-
! 
| 
| 
| 
| 2018
|  | Incumbent lost re-election.New member elected.Republican gain.
| nowrap | 

|}

Oregon 

|-
! 
| 
| 
| 
| 2012 
| Incumbent re-elected.
| nowrap | 

|-
! 
| 
| 
| 
| 1998
|  | Incumbent retired.New member elected.Republican hold.
| nowrap | 

|-
! 
| 
| 
| 
| 1996
| Incumbent re-elected.
| nowrap | 

|-
! 
|
| 
| 
| 1986
| Incumbent re-elected.
| nowrap | 

|-
! 
|
| 
| 
| 2008
| Incumbent re-elected.
| nowrap | 

|}

Pennsylvania 

|-
! 
| 
| 
| 
| 2016
| Incumbent re-elected.
| nowrap | 

|-
! 
| 
| 
| 
| 2014
| Incumbent re-elected.
| nowrap | 

|-
! 
| 
| 
| 
| 2016
| Incumbent re-elected.
| nowrap | 

|-
! 
| 
| 
| 
| 2018
| Incumbent re-elected.
| nowrap | 

|-
! 
| 
| 
| 
| 2018
| Incumbent re-elected.
| nowrap | 

|-
! 
| 
| 
| 
| 2018
| Incumbent re-elected.
| nowrap | 

|-
! 
| 
| 
| 
| 2018
| Incumbent re-elected.
| nowrap | 

|-
! 
| 
| 
| 
| 2012
| Incumbent re-elected.
| nowrap | 

|-
! 
| 
| 
| 
| 2018
| Incumbent re-elected.
| nowrap | 

|-
! 
| 
| 
| 
| 2012
| Incumbent re-elected.
| nowrap | 

|-
! 
| 
| 
| 
| 2016
| Incumbent re-elected.
| nowrap | 

|-
! 
| 
| 
| 
| 2019 
| Incumbent re-elected.
| nowrap | 

|-
! 
| 
| 
| 
| 2018
| Incumbent re-elected.
| nowrap | 

|-
! 
| 
| 
| 
| 2018
| Incumbent re-elected.
| nowrap | 

|-
! 
| 
| 
| 
| 2008
| Incumbent re-elected.
| nowrap | 

|-
! 
| 
| 
| 
| 2010
| Incumbent re-elected.
| nowrap | 

|-
! 
| 
| 
| 
| 2018 
| Incumbent re-elected.
| nowrap | 

|-
! 
| 
| 
| 
| 1994
| Incumbent re-elected.
| nowrap | 

|}

Rhode Island 

|-
! 
| 
| David Cicilline
| 
| 2010
| Incumbent re-elected.
| nowrap | 

|-
! 
| 
| Jim Langevin
| 
| 2000
| Incumbent re-elected.
| nowrap | 
  Jim Langevin (Democratic) 58.2%
 Robert Lancia (Republican) 41.5%

|}

South Carolina 

|-
! 
| 
| 
| 
| 2018
|  | Incumbent lost re-election.New member elected.Republican gain.
| nowrap | 

|-
! 
| 
| 
| 
| 2001 
| Incumbent re-elected.
| nowrap | 

|-
! 
| 
| 
| 
| 2010
| Incumbent re-elected.
| nowrap | 

|-
! 
| 
| 
| 
| 2018
| Incumbent re-elected.
| nowrap | 

|-
! 
| 
| 
| 
| 2017 
| Incumbent re-elected.
| nowrap | 

|-
! 
| 
| 
| 
| 1992
| Incumbent re-elected.
| nowrap | 

|-
! 
| 
| 
| 
| 2012
| Incumbent re-elected.
| nowrap | 

|}

South Dakota 

|-
! 
| 
| Dusty Johnson
| 
| 2018
| Incumbent re-elected.
| nowrap | 

|}

Tennessee 

|-
! 
| 
| 
| 
| 2008
|  | Incumbent retired.New member elected.Republican hold.
| nowrap | 

|-
! 
| 
| 
| 
| 2018
| Incumbent re-elected.
| nowrap | 

|-
! 
| 
| 
| 
| 2010
| Incumbent re-elected.
| nowrap | 

|-
! 
| 
| 
| 
| 2010
| Incumbent re-elected.
| nowrap | 

|-
! 
| 
| 
| 
| 19821994 2002
| Incumbent re-elected.
| nowrap | 

|-
! 
| 
| 
| 
| 2018
| Incumbent re-elected.
| nowrap | 

|-
! 
| 
| 
| 
| 2018
| Incumbent re-elected.
| nowrap | 

|-
! 
| 
| 
| 
| 2016
| Incumbent re-elected.
| nowrap | 

|-
! 
| 
| 
| 
| 2006
| Incumbent re-elected.
| nowrap | 

|}

Texas 

|-
! 
| 
| 
| 
| 2004
| Incumbent re-elected.
| nowrap | 

|-
! 
| 
| 
| 
| 2018
| Incumbent re-elected.
| nowrap | 

|-
! 
| 
| 
| 
| 2018
| Incumbent re-elected.
| nowrap | 

|-
! 
| 
| colspan=3 | Vacant
|  | Rep. John Ratcliffe (R) resigned May 22, 2020.New member elected.Republican hold.
| nowrap | 

|-
! 
| 
| 
| 
| 2018
| Incumbent re-elected.
| nowrap | 

|-
! 
| 
| 
| 
| 2018
| Incumbent re-elected.
| nowrap | 

|-
! 
| 
| 
| 
| 2018
| Incumbent re-elected.
| nowrap | 

|-
! 
| 
| 
| 
| 1996
| Incumbent re-elected.
| nowrap | 

|-
! 
| 
| 
| 
| 2004
| Incumbent re-elected.
| nowrap | 

|-
! 
| 
| 
| 
| 2004
| Incumbent re-elected.
| nowrap | 

|-
! 
| 
| 
| 
| 2004
|  | Incumbent retired.New member elected.Republican hold.
| nowrap | 

|-
! 
| 
| 
| 
| 1996
| Incumbent re-elected.
| nowrap | 

|-
! 
| 
| 
| 
| 1994
|  | Incumbent retired.New member elected.Republican hold.
| nowrap | 

|-
! 
| 
| 
| 
| 2012
| Incumbent re-elected.
| nowrap | 

|-
! 
| 
| 
| 
| 2016
| Incumbent re-elected.
| nowrap | 

|-
! 
| 
| 
| 
| 2018
| Incumbent re-elected.
| nowrap | 

|-
! 
| 
| 
| 
| 2010
|  | Incumbent retired.New member elected.Republican hold.
| nowrap | 

|-
! 
| 
| 
| 
| 1994
| Incumbent re-elected.
| nowrap | 

|-
! 
| 
| 
| 
| 2016
| Incumbent re-elected.
| nowrap | 

|-
! 
| 
| 
| 
| 2012
| Incumbent re-elected.
| nowrap | 

|-
! 
| 
| 
| 
| 2018
| Incumbent re-elected.
| nowrap | 

|-
! 
| 
| 
| 
| 2008
|  | Incumbent retired.New member elected.Republican hold.
| nowrap | 

|-
! 
| 
| 
| 
| 2014
|  | Incumbent retired.New member elected.Republican hold.
| nowrap | 

|-
! 
| 
| 
| 
| 2004
|  | Incumbent retired.New member elected.Republican hold.
| nowrap | 

|-
! 
| 
| 
| 
| 2012
| Incumbent re-elected.
| nowrap | 

|-
! 
| 
| 
| 
| 2002
| Incumbent re-elected.
| nowrap | 

|-
! 
| 
| 
| 
| 2018 
| Incumbent re-elected.
| nowrap | 

|-
! 
| 
| 
| 
| 2004
| Incumbent re-elected.
| nowrap | 

|-
! 
| 
| 
| 
| 2018
| Incumbent re-elected.
| nowrap | 

|-
! 
| 
| 
| 
| 1992
| Incumbent re-elected.
| nowrap | 

|-
! 
| 
| 
| 
| 2002
| Incumbent re-elected.
| nowrap | 

|-
! 
| 
| 
| 
| 2018
| Incumbent re-elected.
| nowrap | 

|-
! 
| 
| 
| 
| 2012
| Incumbent re-elected.
| nowrap | 

|-
! 
| 
| 
| 
| 2012
| Incumbent re-elected.
| nowrap | 

|-
! 
| 
| 
| 
| 1994
| Incumbent re-elected.
| nowrap | 

|-
! 
| 
| 
| 
| 2014
| Incumbent re-elected.
| nowrap | 

|}

Utah 

|-
! 
| 
| 
| 
| 2002
|  | Incumbent retired to run for lieutenant governor of Utah.New member elected.Republican hold.
| nowrap | 

|-
! 
| 
| 
| 
| 2012
| Incumbent re-elected.
| nowrap | 

|-
! 
| 
| 
| 
| 2017 
| Incumbent re-elected.
| nowrap | 

|-
! 
| 
| 
| 
| 2018
|  | Incumbent lost re-election.New member elected.Republican gain.
| nowrap | 

|}

Vermont 

|-
! 
| 
| Peter Welch
| 
| 2006
| Incumbent re-elected.
| nowrap | 

|}

Virginia 

|-
! 
| 
| 
| 
| 2007 
| Incumbent re-elected.
| nowrap | 

|-
! 
| 
| 
| 
| 2018
| Incumbent re-elected.
| nowrap | 
|-
! 
| 
| 
| 
| 1992
| Incumbent re-elected.
| nowrap | 

|-
! 
| 
| 
| 
| 2016
| Incumbent re-elected.
| nowrap | 

|-
! 
| 
| 
| 
| 2018
|  | Incumbent lost renomination.New member elected.Republican hold.
| nowrap | 

|-
! 
| 
| 
| 
| 2018
| Incumbent re-elected.
| nowrap | 

|-
! 
| 
| 
| 
| 2018
| Incumbent re-elected.
| nowrap | 

|-
! 
| 
| 
| 
| 2014
| Incumbent re-elected.
| nowrap | 

|-
! 
| 
| 
| 
| 2010
| Incumbent re-elected.
| nowrap | 

|-
! 
| 
| 
| 
| 2018
| Incumbent re-elected.
| nowrap | 

|-
! 
| 
| 
| 
| 2008
| Incumbent re-elected.
| nowrap | 

|}

Washington 

|-
! 
| 
| 
| 
| 2012
| Incumbent re-elected.
| nowrap | 

|-
! 
| 
| 
| 
| 2000
| Incumbent re-elected.
| nowrap | 

|-
! 
| 
| 
| 
| 2010
| Incumbent re-elected.
| nowrap | 

|-
! 
| 
| 
| 
| 2014
| Incumbent re-elected.
| nowrap | 

|-
! 
| 
| 
| 
| 2004
| Incumbent re-elected.
| nowrap | 

|-
! 
| 
| 
| 
| 2012
| Incumbent re-elected.
| nowrap | 

|-
! 
| 
| 
| 
| 2016
| Incumbent re-elected.
| nowrap | 

|-
! 
|
| 
| 
| 2018
| Incumbent re-elected.
| nowrap | 

|-
! 
| 
| 
| 
| 1996
| Incumbent re-elected.
| nowrap | 

|-
! 
| 
| 
| 
| 2012
|  | Incumbent retired to run for lieutenant governor of Washington.New member elected.Democratic hold.
| nowrap | 

|}

West Virginia 

|-
! 
| 
| 
| 
| 2010
| Incumbent re-elected.
| nowrap | 

|-
! 
| 
| 
| 
| 2014
| Incumbent re-elected.
| nowrap | 

|-
! 
| 
| 
| 
| 2018
| Incumbent re-elected.
| nowrap | 
|}

Wisconsin 

|-
! 
| 
| 
| 
| 2018
| Incumbent re-elected.
| nowrap | 

|-
! 
| 
| 
| 
| 2012
| Incumbent re-elected.
| nowrap | 

|-
! 
|
| 
| 
| 1996
| Incumbent re-elected.
| nowrap | 

|-
! 
| 
| 
| 
| 2004
| Incumbent re-elected.
| nowrap | 

|-
! 
| 
| 
| 
| 1978
|  | Incumbent retired.New member elected.Republican hold.
| nowrap | 

|-
! 
| 
| 
| 
| 2014
| Incumbent re-elected.
| nowrap | 

|-
! 
| 
| 
| 
| 2020 
| Incumbent re-elected.
| nowrap | 

|-
! 
| 
| 
| 
| 2016
| Incumbent re-elected.
| nowrap | 

|}

Wyoming 

|-
! 
| 
| Liz Cheney
| 
| 2016
| Incumbent re-elected.
| nowrap | 

|}

Non-voting delegates

American Samoa 

|-
! 
| Amata Coleman Radewagen
| 
| 2014
| Incumbent re-elected.
| nowrap | 
|}

District of Columbia 

|-
! 
| Eleanor Holmes Norton
| 
| 1990
| Incumbent re-elected.
| nowrap | 
|}

Guam 

|-
! 
| Michael San Nicolas
| 
| 2018
| Incumbent re-elected in a November 17, 2020 run-off election.

| nowrap | 

|}

Northern Mariana Islands 

|-
! 
| Gregorio Kilili Sablan
|  | Independent
| 2008
| Incumbent re-elected.
| nowrap | 
|}

Puerto Rico 

The Resident Commissioner of Puerto Rico is the only member of the United States House of Representatives who is elected for a four-year term.

|-
! 
| Jenniffer González
|  | New Progressive/Republican
| 2016
| Incumbent re-elected.
| nowrap | 
|}

United States Virgin Islands 

|-
! 
| Stacey Plaskett
| 
| 2014
| Incumbent re-elected.
| nowrap | 
|}

See also 
 2020 United States elections
 2020 United States Senate elections
 116th United States Congress
 117th United States Congress
 List of new members of the 117th United States Congress

Notes

References

Further reading